Euaspidoceras perarmatum is an extinct ammonoid cephalopod species that lived during the Jurassic.

Fossils of Euaspidoceras perarmatum may be found in the upper Jurassic, Oxfordian stage of France, Germany, Russia and Saudi Arabia,  around 154 to 146 million years ago.

Description

References

Jurassic ammonites
Aspidoceratidae